The Canon EOS M100 is a digital mirrorless interchangeable-lens camera first announced by Canon Inc. on August 29, 2017. Canon EOS M100 incorporates the proprietary image processor that allows the camera to capture still images up to 6.1 fps using the fixed focus and 4 fps burst mode. The EOS M100 can be connected to all EF, EF-S and TS-E lenses with an available adapter.

Design
The EOS M100 is an interchangeable lens camera that uses the Canon EF-M lens mount.  The EOS M100 is an entry-level model which lacks the large rubber grip, multiple control dials, and hot shoe flash that can be found on the larger and more expensive Canon EOS M6. The EOS M100 uses the same 24.2 MP APS-C sensor as the Canon EOS M6. The EOS M100 also uses the Dual Pixel CMOS autofocus system. However, unlike the EOS M10, the EOS M100 features the same DIGIC 7 image processor as the newer Canon EOS M6. The camera supports uncompressed 1080p video. The camera has in-camera RAW conversion feature pre-loaded on it which is a handy option to convert images.

Sales
In its initial press release announcing the camera, Canon revealed that the camera would be sold in a kit including the EOS M100 and an EF-M 15-45mm f/3.5-6.3 IS STM zoom lens at a retail price of $599.99.

References

External links
EOS M100 User Manual
Canon stellt spiegellose 24-MP-Systemkamera EOS M100 und neue Profi-Objektive der L-Serie vor

Canon EF-M-mount cameras
Cameras introduced in 2017